Mastedon is a Christian rock band formed by brothers Dino and John Elefante (former lead singer and songwriter of Kansas) in the mid-1980s. The band was formed mainly as a studio project and have released three full-length albums and two stand-alone songs on compilation albums.
Mastedon signed with Italian label Frontiers Records in 2009 and release Mastedon 3.

Discography
 "Wasn't It Love" from California Metal (1987)
 "Get Up" from California Metal II (1988)
 It's a Jungle Out There! (1989) Regency Records
 Lofcaudio (1990) Pakaderm Records
 3 (2009) [Italy / same as Revolution of Mind (2010)]
 It's a Jungle Out There! 20th Anniversary Edition (2009) [re-release with three bonus tracks]
 Revolution of Mind (as 'John Elefante and Mastedon') (2010) [North America / same as 3 (2009)]

References

Christian rock groups from Tennessee
Frontiers Records artists